The Third Way of Love is a 2015 Chinese romance film directed by John H. Lee and starring Liu Yifei and Song Seung-heon. The film was released on 25 September 2015.

Plot
The film follows Lin Qi Zheng (Song Seung-Heon), who is from a rich family, and Zou Yu (Yifei Liu) who is a smart and beautiful lawyer, as they fall in love.

Cast
 Liu Yifei as Zou Yu
 Song Seung-heon as Lin Qizheng
 OD
 Jessie Chiang
 Meng Jia as Zou Yue (Yu's younger sister)
 Jiang Yuchen as Jiang Xinyao
 Zong Xiaoju as Ouyang (department head)
 Qu Gang as Fu
 Liu Jin as the labour contractor
 Pan Yigang as Wang (suicidal worker)
 Xue Yuanyuan (Wang's wife)
 Gao Rui 
 Liu Zhiyun
 Zhao Yiming
 Feng Dalu (Lin Qizheng's father)
 Zhang Pingjuan (Lin Qizheng's mother)

References

External links
 

2015 films
2015 romantic drama films
Chinese romantic drama films
2010s Mandarin-language films